Sarap, 'Di Ba?, formerly Sarap Diva, is a Philippine television cooking talk show broadcast by GMA Network. Originally hosted by Regine Velasquez, it premiered on October 6, 2012 as Sarap Diva on the network's morning line-up replacing Kapuso Movie Festival. It premiered on October 20, 2018 as Sarap Di Ba?. Carmina Villarroel, Mavy Legaspi and Cassy Legaspi currently serve as the hosts.

Cast

Sarap Diva

 Regine Velasquez 
 Terry Gian as Inday 

Recurring guests
 Ate Gay 
 Boobay 
 Divine Tetay 
 Super Tekla 

Musician
 Raul Mitra

Sarap, 'Di Ba?
 Carmina Villarroel 
 Mavy Legaspi 
 Cassy Legaspi 
 Zoren Legaspi

Production

In March 2020, the admission of a live audience in the studio and production were suspended due to the enhanced community quarantine in Luzon by the COVID-19 pandemic. The show resumed its programming on July 18, 2020.

Ratings
According to AGB Nielsen Philippines' Mega Manila household television ratings, the pilot episode of Sarap Diva earned a 10.1% rating. While based from People television homes, the pilot episode of Sarap, 'Di Ba? earned a 5.2% rating.

Accolades

References

External links
 
 
 

2012 Philippine television series debuts
Filipino-language television shows
GMA Network original programming
Philippine cooking television series
Philippine television talk shows
Television productions suspended due to the COVID-19 pandemic